Kounta is an Australian software company founded in 2012. The company's flagship product, Kounta, comprises a cloud based point of sale mobile app.

History

Kounta was founded in 2012 by entrepreneur Nick Cloete. The company is headquartered in Sydney, Australia. In 2012, the company launched its flagship product, Kounta, a hospitality-focused point of sale (POS) mobile app for iPad, Android, Mac, and Windows. The app was initially a web-based application, and later developed into an online cash register and inventory management system that allows businesses to take payments from customers via mobile devices. The app has been made available for iPad, iPhone, and Android devices; as well as iOS, Windows, and other peripherals.

In 2012, Kounta partnered with Epson, providing a cloud-based POS platform for Epson printers. In 2013, the company formed a partnership with PayPal, integrating cashless and cardless transaction options via PayPal's mobile app. In 2014, MYOB (company) made an undisclosed investment towards Kounta. This partnership led to the development of MYOB Kounta, a co-branded application merging Kounta's POS with MYOB's application software. MYOB Kounta launched in October of the same year. 

In 2016, Kounta announced a partnership with the Commonwealth Bank of Australia to include the Kounta app onto "Albert", the bank's EFTPOS tablet. This allowed the Commonwealth Bank of Australia to become the first bank to manage all customers operations from a single device and mobile application.

Technology

The Kounta POS is a software-as-a-service (SaaS) that runs as an application in web browsers as well as natively on iOS and Android operating systems.

Kounta also incorporates an Open API, making it possible for other software providers to integrate complementary apps, further extending the software's use. Traditional IT tasks, such as data backup and encryption, hardware maintenance, and server upgrades are handled by Kounta's data center. Kounta is made accessible via paid monthly subscription licenses.

Acquisition by Lightspeed

In October 2019, Kounta was acquired by Lightspeed – a leading omnichannel point of sale platform based in Montreal, Canada. Kounta was Lightspeed’s third acquisition in 2019, and was acquired for $35.3 million USD.

Lightspeed is an advanced commerce platform for retail, hospitality, and golf businesses across the world. With their headquarters in Montreal, Canada – they also have offices across North America, EMEA, as well as in the Asia-Pacific region. 

The company was listed in the New York Stock Exchange in September 2020 under the same symbol,, which was used for their initial listing in the Toronto Stock Exchange (TSX). Lightspeed announced that their intention for their net proceeds is to ‘pursue...growth strategies.'

The company acquired Vend – a cloud-based retail management software company based in Auckland, New Zealand.

See also
 Software companies

References

External links 

Reviews on Kounta
Reviews on Kounta from Capterra

Kounta on the App Store
Kounta on Google Play
Software companies of Australia
Point of sale companies
Web applications
Business software companies
Business software for Windows
Business software for macOS
Customer relationship management software companies
Customer relationship management software
Workflow applications
Australian companies established in 2012
Software companies established in 2012
Companies based in Sydney